London—Fanshawe is a federal electoral district in Ontario, Canada, that has been represented in the House of Commons of Canada since 1997.

Geography
The district consists of the southeast part of the City of London.

Specifically, it consists of the part of the city lying east and north of a line drawn from the northern limit of the city south along Highbury Avenue North, west along the Thames River (South Branch), south along the Canadian National Railway, west along Commissioners Road East, south along Wharncliffe Road South, east along Southdale Road East, south along White Oak Road, east along Exeter Road, north along Meg Drive, west along Jalna Boulevard, north along Ernest Avenue, east along Bradley Avenue, north along Highbury Avenue South, east along Arran Place and Bradley Avenue to the eastern limit of the city.

History

The riding was created in 1996 from parts of London East and London—Middlesex. From 1997 until 2005 it was represented by Liberal/Independent Member of Parliament Pat O'Brien.

It consisted initially of the part of the City of London lying east and north of a line drawn from the northern limit of the city south along Highbury Avenue and Highway 126, west along the Thames River, south along the Canadian National Railway tracks, west along Commissioners Road East, south along Wharncliffe Road South, east along Southdale Road East, south along White Oak Road, east along Exeter Road, north along Meg Drive, west along Jalna Boulevard, north along Ernest Avenue, east along Bradley Avenue, north along the Highbury Avenue, east along Arran Place and Bradley Avenue to the eastern limit of the city.

In 2003, it was given its current boundaries as described above.

This riding gained territory from London North Centre and Elgin—Middlesex—London during the 2012 electoral redistribution.

Demographics 
According to the 2021 Canada Census

Ethnic groups: 67.7% White, 5.8% Arab, 5.4% Black, 5.0% South Asian, 4.4% Indigenous, 3.2% Latin American, 2.4% Southeast Asian, 2.0% Filipino, 1.0% Chinese, 1.0% West Asian

Languages: 72.4% English, 4.1% Arabic, 2.8% Spanish, 1.9% Portuguese, 1.5% Polish, 1.1% French, 1.0% Punjabi

Religions: 48.5% Christian (22.6% Catholic, 3.9% Anglican, 3.8% United Church, 1.6% Baptist, 1.5% Christian Orthodox, 1.5% Pentecostal, 1.3% Presbyterian, 12.3% Other), 8.7% Muslim, 1.3% Hindu, 1.1% Buddhist, 1.1% Sikh, 38.1% None

Median income: $37,600 (2020)

Average income: $43,120 (2020)

Members of Parliament

This riding has elected the following members of the House of Commons of Canada:

Current Member of Parliament
Its Member of Parliament is Lindsay Mathyssen of the New Democratic Party who was first elected in the 2019 election. She replaced her Mother Irene Mathyssen, who did not stand for reelection.

Election results

 		 	 

			

Note: Conservative vote is compared to the total of the Canadian Alliance vote and Progressive Conservative vote in 2000 election.

Note: Canadian Alliance vote is compared to the Reform vote in 1997 election.

See also
 List of Canadian federal electoral districts
 Past Canadian electoral districts

References

Federal riding history from the Library of Parliament
2011 Results from Elections Canada
 Campaign expense data from Elections Canada

Notes

External links
 Ontario - 2006 Federal Elections	

Ontario federal electoral districts
Politics of London, Ontario